The Onondaga Yacht Club is a private yacht club located in Liverpool, New York, on the shore of Onondaga Lake.

In 1953, the club was used by the Syracuse U. Sailing team for college competition.

Fleets 
The club is home of Snipe fleet number 18, Lightning fleet number 10, and a Laser fleet.

References

External links 
 Official website

1883 establishments in New York (state)
Sailing in New York (state) 
Yacht clubs in the United States
Sports in Syracuse, New York
Onondaga Lake